Major general Mahmoud al-Subaihi is a Yemeni military officer. He served in the cabinet of President Abdrabbuh Mansur Hadi as defence minister. In the Yemen Army, he holds the rank of major general. He was appointed to head the Ministry of Defence by Prime Minister Khaled Bahah in November 2014.

Biography
al-Subaihi was born in 1948 in Huwaireb, Al Madaribah Wa Al Arah District, Lahij Governorate. He had a bachelor's degree in military science from the military academy in Aden in 1976, then he studied Master's in the Soviet Union from 1978 to 1982. Later on, he fought along with Ali Salem al Beidh during the 1994 Yemeni Civil War.

al-Subaihi was placed under house arrest by the Houthis in January 2015, during their coup d'état in Sana'a. He resigned on 22 January, but after the Houthis' "constitutional declaration" on 6 February, in which they dissolved parliament and officially took control of the government, he was appointed to head the Houthi government's Supreme Security Committee. He attended the announcement of the constitutional declaration in Sana'a. On 7 March, however, he fled Sana'a and traveled to Lahij Governorate, eventually joining President Hadi in Aden. Jalal al-Rowaishan was appointed to succeed him as chairman of the Houthi-appointed Supreme Security Committee.

Forces commanded by al-Subaihi participated in the Battle of Aden Airport on 19 March 2015, repelling special units loyal to former president Ali Abdullah Saleh from Aden International Airport and capturing an adjacent military base. They also fought against a Houthi military advance through the Lahij Governorate, where al-Subaihi was reportedly captured on 25 March 2015 in Al Houtah. Reuters cited Houthi and tribal sources reporting that he was released on 22 April, amid the start of Operation Restoring Hope.

In October 2018, Oman reported that it convinced the Houthis to allow al-Subaihi to contact his family for the first time in three years.

References

Living people
Defence ministers of Yemen
21st-century Yemeni politicians
Yemeni generals
1948 births
People from Lahij Governorate
Yemeni military personnel of the Yemeni Civil War (2014–present)
Ministry of Defense (Yemen)
20th-century Yemeni military personnel